The list of FIFA Confederations Cup winning managers includes winning managers over the years in the different competitions (or Cups) held by FIFA. The FIFA Confederations Cup was an international association football tournament for men's national teams, held every four years.

Winning managers

Lists of association football managers